Maridi is a town in South Sudan.

Location
Maridi is located in Maridi County, Western Equatoria State, near the international border between South Sudan and the Democratic Republic of the Congo. The coordinates of Maridi are: 4° 54' 36.00"N, 29° 27' 0.00"E (Latitude: 4.9100; Longitude: 29.4500).

Overview
Maridi has been a regional center of government since colonial times. It is also reputed to be a center of education in South Sudan. Yambio is the state capital of Western Equatoria State, which is 140 km from Maridi. Khazana Lake is a popular picnic spot and one can find NGO and UN staff enjoying the scenic beauty on a typical Sunday. The County remains lush green during the rainy season with Mango trees full of fruits. The habitat boosts of a diverse fauna, most common of them being the baboons, deer and the black mamba.

Population
In 2011, the population of Maridi was estimated at approximately 18,000. Maridi County is further divided into five Payams which have a total 17 Bomas under them. The population of the county is a mixed of many tribes prominent being, Azande, Baka, Mundu, Muro Kodo and Avukaya.

Transport
The town is served by Maridi Airport known to be the largest airport in Western Equatoria. It has a single unpaved runway, the dimensions of which are not publicly known at this time. Roads (murram base dirt roads) to and from Maridi have been reconditioned and are quite good.

History 
In September 2015, an oil tanker exploded on a road about 20 km from Maridi, at Bahir Naam Payam, killing over 170 people. The truck had gone off the road and overturned. People were approaching the truck in order to siphon petrol from it when it exploded. Injured were taken to Maridi Civil Hospital and Olo Primary Health Clinic in Mambe Payam, according to Radio Tamazuj.

Points of interest
The points of interest in and around Maridi include the following:

 The offices of Maridi Town Council
 Maridi Central Market
 Maridi Airport - A public, civil airport, with a single unpaved runway
 Maridi Power Sector - A locally operated electric membership company was inaugurated in 2011. The system is served by a 1.2 MW diesel generation station. Electricity is distributed at 11 kV and customers served 230/415 V, 50 Hz power, for approximately 12 hours per day. As of this edit there are approximately 600 electric meters installed on the system.
 Maridi Teacher Training Institute
 Ambi Teacher Training Institute
 U N County Support Base Maridi
 Don Bosco school and youth centre
 Kazana Lake Maridi
Maridi National Health Training Institutes
Maridi School of Nursing and Midwifery
 Maridi water treatment plant - A water treatment plant and distribution system was inaugurated in 2010. This plant serves much of the town through water points located near roads and populated areas.

See also
Maridi Arabic
Maridi Airport
Western Equatoria
Equatoria

References

External links
 Location of Maridi At Google Maps

Populated places in Western Equatoria
Equatoria